Peter Francis (born 16 January 1958) is a former Australian rules footballer who played with four VFL clubs during the 1980s.

Victorian country recruit Peter Francis joined Carlton in 1977 and made his senior debut two seasons later in Round 1. 1979. He played in their thrilling five point Grand Final win against Collingwood that year in what would be the only premiership of his ten season career. Halfway through the 1981 season he was traded to Fitzroy for fellow wingman Frank Marchesani. He played 40 games with Fitzroy before moving on to Richmond and then finished his career with a stint at Essendon.

For the 1989 and 1990 seasons, Francis served as the head coach of the Box Hill Hawks Football Club. In 1989, Francis guided the club to 3rd place, equalling its best VFA result to that time.

Francis was appointed St Kilda's Reserves/Development Coach in 1991. A role he held until 1994.

In 1995 Francis was appointed fulltime Coach of the Gippsland Power Football Club in the AFL Elite Player Pathway TAC Cup Competition and held that position until 2000. He then took over the role of Regional/Talent Manager of the Gippsland Power Football Club in 2001 until his retirement in 2019.

External links

Blueseum profile

1958 births
Living people
Carlton Football Club players
Carlton Football Club Premiership players
Fitzroy Football Club players
Richmond Football Club players
Essendon Football Club players
Box Hill Football Club players
Box Hill Football Club coaches
Australian rules footballers from Victoria (Australia)
One-time VFL/AFL Premiership players